Keep Movin' On is the eighteenth studio album by American country singer Merle Haggard and The Strangers released in 1975. It reached number one on the Billboard country albums chart. "Movin' On" was a full-length version of a song Haggard recorded as the theme song to the TV series Movin' On.

History
Keep Movin' On would be one of Haggard's most commercially successful albums, containing three #1 hits. The first of these, "Kentucky Gambler," had been written by fellow country star Dolly Parton (she also provides background vocals on Haggard's version). It stayed at number one for a single week and spent a total of eleven weeks on the chart. Haggard had first recorded one of Parton's compositions, "In the Good Old Days (When Things Were Bad)" on his 1968 album Mama Tried.

"Always Wanting You" followed "Kentucky Gambler" to the top of the Billboard country singles chart, adorned with an almost easy listening pop sound that producer Ken Nelson also employs on several of the album's other tracks. The sweetened sound that Nelson employed on Haggard's final Capitol LPs followed the fashionable countrypolitan sound that was dominating country radio in the mid-seventies.

The final #1 song from the album was its title track, which was the full-length version of a song that Haggard had recorded as the theme song to the TV series Movin' On starring Claude Akins and Frank Converse, which ran for two seasons on NBC. "Movin' On" became Haggard's seventh consecutive #1 hit and thirteenth since 1970.

Another song from the album is "Life’s like Poetry", which Haggard wrote for his friend Lefty Frizzell, who was trying to make a comeback. Frizzell recorded the song in January 1975, and his version peaked at No. 67 on the Billboard country charts, and was to be Frizzell's second-to-last single to hit the charts (before "Falling"); Frizzell would suffer from a stroke and die in July that year.

Reception

Mark Deming of AllMusic states that, while the album is "not a masterpiece," it is worth a listen. "If the arrangements and production are noticeably more tricked up than the minimal perfection of Haggard's 1960s sides and these lyrics aren't his sharpest meditations on the male/female relationship, for the most part Keep Movin' On finds Hag in worthy form, and 'Always Wanting You,' 'A Man's Got to Give Up a Lot,' and 'September in Miami' are memorable if lesser-known numbers."

Track listing
All songs by Merle Haggard unless otherwise noted:

 "Movin' On"
 "Life's Like Poetry"
 "I've Got a Darlin' (For a Wife)" (Merle Haggard, Ronnie Reno)
 "These Mem'ries We're Making Tonight"
 "You'll Always Be Special"
 "September in Miami"
 "Always Wanting You"
 "Kentucky Gambler" (Dolly Parton)
 "Here in Frisco"
 "I've Got a Yearning"
 "A Man's Gotta Give Up a Lot"

Personnel
Merle Haggard– vocals, guitar

The Strangers:
Roy Nichols – lead guitar
Norman Hamlet – steel guitar, dobro
 Tiny Moore – mandolin
 Ronnie Reno – guitar
 Mark Yeary – piano
 Johnny Meeks - bass
Biff Adam – drums
Don Markham – saxophone

with
Dave Kirby – guitar
James Tittle – bass
Johnny Gimble – fiddle

and
 Dolly Parton - background vocals on "Kentucky Gambler"
Hargus "Pig" Robbins – piano, organ
Chuck Berghofer – bass
 Bob Moore – bass
 Bill Puett – horns

Charts

Weekly charts

Year-end charts

References

1975 albums
Merle Haggard albums
Capitol Records albums
Albums produced by Ken Nelson (United States record producer)